The University of Pittsburgh School of Dental Medicine is the dental school of the University of Pittsburgh (Pitt). It is located in Pittsburgh, Pennsylvania, United States. It is one of Pitt's six schools of the health sciences and one of several dental schools in Pennsylvania. It is closely affiliated with the University of Pittsburgh Medical Center. The School of Dental Medicine accepted 3.6% of applicants for the class of 2016, a record low for the school's entire history.

It is located in Salk Hall on Pitt's campus. Each year, between 70 and 80 students graduate from Pitt's D.M.D. program.

Admission into the School of Dental Medicine is highly competitive. Eighty incoming students were accepted out of 2,200 applications submitted. Total mean college GPA of incoming students in 2017 was 3.74 (science 3.67); academic average DAT score was 21.6.

Dr. Marnie Oakley is the School of Dental Medicine's current interim dean as of 2022.

History

Founded as the Pittsburgh Dental College, the school was organized and chartered simultaneously with its establishment as a department of dentistry at the  Western University of Pennsylvania, the former name of the University of Pittsburgh. The School of Dental Medicine welcomed its first class of 119 freshmen that September. The school grew quickly and moved into increasingly larger facilities. Under the leadership of Dean H. Edmund Friesell, the Dental College was renamed the School of Dentistry when it became an integral part of the university when the university assumed charge of the Dental Department and property following the implementation of an agreement on October 5, 1905.  By the 1920s, the dental school was reported to be, for at least a time, the largest in the world.

The School of Dental Medicine has occupied its current space in Salk Hall, which was converted from a former municipal hospital facility to house Pitt's dental and pharmacy schools, since 1967.

Noteworthy events in School of Dental Medicine history:
 The Pittsburgh Dental College admitted its first female student, Ms. Mary L. Glenn, in 1898. In 2008-09, 34 percent of the students in the School of Dental Medicine's entering freshman class were women.
 The School of Dentistry awarded its first master's degree in dentistry to Nora E. Murry in 1935. The School of Dental Medicine now awards advanced degrees in 10 different disciplines.
 In 1963, the school graduated its first class of dental assistants. Pitt's dental hygiene program is the only such program in the state of Pennsylvania that is part of a major university and accredited dental school and affiliated with a medical center.
 In 1965, five of the dental school's chairs were dedicated to the treatment of children with disabilities. Today, the School of Dental Medicine bears the reputation of leadership and innovation in treatment of patients with special needs.
 The Doctor of Dental Medicine (D.M.D.) degree replaced the Doctor of Dental Surgery degree in 1967 and the school was renamed the School of Dental Medicine to reflect the profession's evolution.

Education

The University of Pittsburgh School of Dental Medicine offers the following educational programs:

First Professional DMD

Residency Training Programs in:
 Dental Anesthesiology
 Endodontics
 General Practice Residency
 Oral and maxillofacial pathology
 Oral and Maxillofacial Surgery
 Orthodontics and Dentofacial Orthopedics
 Pediatric Dentistry
 Periodontics
 Prosthodontics
Dental Hygiene
 Certificate
 Baccalaureate
International/Advanced Standing Program
Interschool Collaborative Programs
 Multidisciplinary Master of Public Health
 Master of Education, Higher Education Administration
 Master of Education, Research Methodology
 Graduate Certificate in Geriatric Dentistry
Dental Informatics Postgraduate Program

The School of Dental Medicine also offers a variety of continuing education courses, which are held both on-campus locations and at 13 off-site locations.

Research

The School of Dental Medicine is committed to conducting groundbreaking research that advances scientific knowledge and leads to novel approaches to dental care. For fiscal year 2019, the school is ranked 4th in research funding by the National Institute for Dental and Craniofacial Research, one of the National Institutes of Health.

School of Dental Medicine faculty members are involved in the following research centers:

 Center for Oral Health Research in Appalachia
 Center for Dental Informatics
 Center for Craniofacial and Dental Genetics
 Center for Craniofacial Regeneration
 Dental Registry and DNA Repository

Additional research is ongoing in the following departments:
 Dental Anesthesiology
 Dental Public Health
 Oral Biology
 Oral and Maxillofacial Surgery
 Oral and Maxillofacial Radiology
 Orthodontics & Dentofacial Orthopedics
 Pediatric Dentistry
 Periodontics
 Prosthodontics

The school offers numerous opportunities for students interested in pursuing scientific research as well. The Dean's Summer Research Scholarship supports a three-month summer research experience to three incoming first professional dental students each year. Also, the school's annual research symposium showcases student work in scientific investigation.

School Facilities

Educational

The School of Dental Medicine facility occupies Salk Hall and the adjoining Salk Hall Dental Annex and is located on the University's upper campus near UPMC hospitals and the School of Medicine.

 Simulation Clinic: This unique teaching laboratory—one of the first such facilities at a U.S. dental school—allows students to develop practical dental treatment skills in a hands-on fashion through patient simulation. Students practice their craft on mannequins linked to computers that facilitate evaluation by instructors.
 The Salk Hall Dental Annex/Adjacent Clinics: The School of Dental Medicine clinical facilities include 254 operatories for general and specialized dental treatment, most of which are semi-private treatment rooms. New, state-of-the-art clinical facilities include the Multidisciplinary Implant Center and the Center for Patients with Special Needs.
 Lecture Facilities: The recently renovated lecture facilities in Salk Hall include comfortable seating and new teaching stations with multimedia support areas.
 The Robinson Student Computer Center: This computer laboratory/classroom offers a contemporary environment for teaching and developing skills in information technology.
 Student Lounges: Equipped with a small kitchen and e-mail kiosks for easy access to the Internet, the dental student lounges provide students with an accessible and useful place to study and socialize.
 Edward J. Forrest Continuing Education Center: A premier facility designed specifically for continuing education, the Center includes five fully equipped operatories, a sterilization and storage room, and a laboratory that will accommodate twelve persons for hands-on activities. The center also includes a reception area, staff offices, conference area, and the W. Arthur George Auditorium, which can seat approximately sixty attendees.

Clinical

The School of Dental Medicine treats many patients in its clinical facilities, offering the full range of dental services. Treatment is provided by dental hygiene students, third- and fourth-year dental students or by specialty residents and is supervised by faculty members.
Patients who prefer treatment by faculty members rather than students may choose University Dental Health Services, the School of Dental Medicine's faculty practice. UDHS dentists also offer comprehensive services, ranging from routine dental care to various specialty areas.

A number of the School of Dental Medicine's clinical offerings are specialized for certain groups of patients.
 Center for Patients with Special Needs: The Center provides comprehensive dental care to patients with disabilities. It is equipped with six dedicated, multi-specialty treatment rooms including two private treatment areas equipped for general anesthesia, a designated recovery area for sedation and general anesthesia patients, and a dedicated waiting and reception area.
 Multidisciplinary Implant Center: Because they look and feel more like natural teeth, implants offer a superior alternative for tooth replacement, and the MIC offers a high-quality facility and a collaborative environment for providing this increasingly common treatment.
 Emergency Clinic: The School of Dental Medicine is equipped to handle dental emergencies for patients who do not have access to such care elsewhere. Dental emergencies may include acute pain, swelling, or bleeding, for example.
 Oral Pathology Biopsy Service: An Oral Pathology biopsy service exists for community Oral and Maxillofacial Surgeons and other dentists and dental specialists in need of biopsy interpretation 
 Cone-beam computed topography unit: The CBCT unit uses a cone-shaped X-ray rather than a linear one to create three-dimensional images that have many applications in dental medicine. CBCT imaging can be helpful in planning implants, orthognathic surgery, and evaluating pathology, among other dental procedures. Dentists practicing in the Pittsburgh region may schedule patients for CBCT scans as an additional resource in their course of treatment.
Other

The School of Dental Medicine's Dental Museum is now closed, at one time it featured a host of dental artifacts used by early 20th century practitioners. It also included works of fine art by alumnus Dr. Frederick Franck (DDS ’42) and Mr. Virgil Cantini.

Publications

The School of Dental Medicine publishes Pitt Dental Magazine biannually to inform the school's alumni and friends about its activities and initiatives. It also distributes an electronic alumni newsletter a number of times throughout the year and a monthly e-newsletter to faculty, staff, and students at the school.

The school also publishes a Facts and Figures brochure, which is updated annually.

Notable Alumni/Faculty
W. Harry Archer (DDS, 1927) – Oral surgeon who contributed to the establishment of the specialty and hospital based dentistry 
Leonard M. Monheim (DDS, 1933) – Established the first dental anesthesiology program in the country, President of Presbyterian-University Hospital medical staff at his death, author of 6 textbooks

Celebrity alumni
John Bain "Jock" Sutherland (DDS, 1918) – Successful football coach and dental faculty at the University of Pittsburgh and later coach for the Pittsburgh Steelers   
 Britt Baker (DMD, 2018) – professional wrestler with All Elite Wrestling, also with a regular dental practice in Florida

References

Further reading

External links

 

Dental Medicine, School of
Dental schools in Pennsylvania
University of Pittsburgh Medical Center
1896 establishments in Pennsylvania
Educational institutions established in 1896